Brotia sumatrensis is a species of freshwater snail with an operculum, an aquatic gastropod mollusk in the family Pachychilidae. Previously frequently synonymized with Brotia costula, biological systematics was able to molecularly distinguish the two.

Distribution 
 Sumatra, Indonesia

References

External links 

sumatrensis
Gastropods described in 1875